Canistropsis elata is a species of flowering plant in the genus Canistropsis.

Description
This bromeliad is endemic to the Atlantic Forest biome (Mata Atlantica Brasileira) within Rio de Janeiro (state), located in southeastern Brazil.

It is a critically endangered species.

References

elata
Endemic flora of Brazil
Flora of Rio de Janeiro (state)
Flora of São Paulo (state)
Flora of the Atlantic Forest
Critically endangered flora of South America